The Constitutional Democratic Party – Party of Popular Freedom (Russian: Конституционно-демократическая партия - Партия народной свободы) was a political party in the USSR and Russia. It followed a path of development similar to that of the Democratic Party of Russia in early 1990s, developing from pro-reform/pro-democracy positions (as a member of the Democratic Russia coalition until late 1991) to nationalist opposition to Yeltsin and successive governments.

The party was founded in 1990 by disenchanted 'fundamentalist' members of the Union of Constitutional Democrats. The party leaders adopted the 1917 program of the Cadet party of the Russian Empire. Mikhail Astafyev, people's deputy of RSFSR defected to the new organization in August 1990.

In June 1991 the 'XI Refoundation Congress' of the Cadet party took place (the last congress of the historical cadet party was held in 1920). Astafyev was elected as the chairman of the re-established party. The party was initially strongly pro-reform and joined the Democratic Russia coalition, but moved to the opposition following the collapse of the Soviet Union. Whereas in 1991 they advocated 'dis-establishing the totalitarian communist regime', in early 1992, Astafyev in effect joined the radical communist-nationalist opposition to Yeltsin's government, which led a number of party members to resign. From that time on, the party called for resignation of the 'government of Yeltsin-Gaidar', putting end to privatization of state enterprises and 'collapse of kolkhozes', 'veto to territorial concessions' etc. Astafyev concentrated his efforts on the National Salvation Front activities. The party could not participate in the 1993 legislative election due to failing to gather necessary number of signatures. In 1994, the Cadet party split, as internal opposition led by N.Kulikov accused Astafyev of having moved to 'left-wing extremist positions'. In 1995, Astafyev joined Alexander Rutskoy's Derzhava movement, but the two soon parted ways due to a dispute in dividing positions in electoral list. Later in 1995, the Cadet party of Astafyev joined Zemsky sobor ('All-National Congress'), another minor nationalist coalition.

See also
Constitutional Democratic Party
Nashi
Liberal Democratic Party of Russia
Democratic Party of Russia

References
https://web.archive.org/web/20090302090254/http://www.partinform.ru/ros_mn/rm_6.htm
Constitution of the Russian Federation, proposed by the party.

1990 establishments in Russia
Defunct nationalist parties in Russia
Political parties established in 1990
Political parties in the Soviet Union
Political parties with year of disestablishment missing
Russian democracy movements
Soviet opposition groups
Anti-communist parties